Martin Halsall (born 25 December 1984 in Blackpool, England), is a rugby union player for Nottingham R.F.C. in the RFU Championship. He plays as a tighthead prop and started his career with Sale Sharks, debuting for the first team in 2004. In the 2005–2006 season, Halsall made 1 appearance as Sale Sharks won their first ever Premiership title. In December 2010, Halsall left Sale to play for Nottingham in the hope of playing more first-team matches. Halsall retired in May 2011 following neck injuries.

References

External links
Sale Sharks profile
Guinness premiership profile

1984 births
Living people
English rugby union players
Nottingham R.F.C. players
Sale Sharks players
Rugby union props
Rugby union players from Blackpool